Anita Lindblom (14 December 1937 – 6 September 2020) was a Swedish actress and singer. She appeared in thirteen films between 1957 and 1974. Lindblom also recorded music. Her single Sånt är livet (a cover of Roy Hamilton's You Can Have Her) was a Norwegian #1 in 1962.

Lindblom died on 6 September 2020 in France, where she had been living since 1969.

Discography
 Jul med tradition (1975)

Selected filmography
 Mannequin in Red (1958)
 The Jazz Boy (1958)
 Sailors (1964)
 A Swedish Love Story (1970)

References

External links

1937 births
2020 deaths
20th-century Swedish actresses
People from Gävle
Swedish film actresses
Swedish television actresses